Alex M. Call (born September 27, 1994) is an American professional baseball outfielder for the Washington Nationals of Major League Baseball (MLB). He made his MLB debut in 2022 with the Cleveland Guardians.

Amateur career
Born in Burnsville, Minnesota, Call attended River Falls High School in River Falls, Wisconsin, and Ball State University, where he played college baseball for the Ball State Cardinals. In 2015, he played collegiate summer baseball with the Orleans Firebirds of the Cape Cod Baseball League.

Professional career

Chicago White Sox
The Chicago White Sox selected Call in the third round of the 2016 MLB Draft. He split time between the rookie-level Great Falls Voyagers and Single-A Kannapolis Intimidators in his debut campaign, slashing a cumulative .308/.394/.445 with 6 home runs, 35 RBI, and 14 stolen bases. In 2017, Call played for the rookie-level Arizona League White Sox, Kannapolis, and the High-A Winston-Salem Dash, batting a combined .207/.295/.317 with 3 home runs, 33 RBI, and 5 stolen bases. The next year, Call split the season between Winston-Salem and the Double-A Birmingham Barons. In 123 games between the two affiliates, he hit .248/.345/.415 with 12 home runs, 58 RBI, and 6 stolen bases.

Cleveland Indians / Guardians
On December 15, 2018, Call was traded to the Cleveland Indians in exchange for Yonder Alonso. He spent the 2019 season with the Double-A Akron RubberDucks, slashing .205/.266/.321 with 5 home runs and 31 RBI across 81 games.

Call did not play in a game in 2020 due to the cancellation of the minor league season because of the COVID-19 pandemic. In 2021, Call played in 109 games split between Akron and the Triple-A Columbus Clippers, hitting .262/.356/.438 with 15 home runs, 50 RBI, and 15 stolen bases. He was assigned to Triple-A Columbus to begin the 2022 season

The Guardians selected Call's contract on July 11, 2022 and promoted him to the major leagues for the first time. He made his major league debut that same day as a pinch hitter. He appeared in 12 big league games for Cleveland, going 2-for-12 with four walks. On August 5, 2022, the Guardians designated Call for assignment after Hunter Gaddis’ contract was selected.

Washington Nationals
On August 7, 2022, Call was claimed off waivers by the Washington Nationals. On September 8, 2022, Call had four hits in five at bats, including a three-run home run, and five RBIs in the Nationals 11-6 win over the St. Louis Cardinals.

References

External links

1994 births
Living people
Akron RubberDucks players
Arizona League White Sox players
Ball State Cardinals baseball players
Baseball players from Minnesota
Birmingham Barons players
Cleveland Guardians players
Columbus Clippers players
Great Falls Voyagers players
Kannapolis Intimidators players
Major League Baseball outfielders
Orleans Firebirds players
People from Burnsville, Minnesota
Washington Nationals players
Winston-Salem Dash players
American expatriate baseball players in the Dominican Republic
Tigres del Licey players